"Let Me Introduce You to the Family" is a 1981 song by English rock band The Stranglers. The first single released from La Folie, it peaked at number 42 in the UK Singles Chart.

References

The Stranglers songs
1981 singles
1981 songs
Songs written by Hugh Cornwell
Songs written by Jean-Jacques Burnel
Songs written by Dave Greenfield
Songs written by Jet Black
Liberty Records singles